The 2006–07 Hong Kong First Division League season was the 95th since its establishment.

In this season, the First Division was composed by 10 teams. HKFC and Tai Po have been promoted from the Second Division. The two bottom teams of the First Division in last season, South China and Hong Kong 08, were reinstated.

South China won their 28th league title by defeating Lanwa Redbull in their last match of the season on 27 April 2007.

League table

Full table

Home matches only

Away matches only

Teams

Featured matches
 Highest scoring game
(round 12) (Hong Kong 08 0–8 South China)
The first match of South China after the official return of head coach Casemiro Mior. Scorer table leader Tales Schutz scored 4 goals in the match, the most goals in a match during the season.

 Biggest goal difference
(round 12) (Hong Kong 08 0–8 South China) (refer to Highest Scoring Game)

 Highest attendance
(round 17) (Citizen 0–1 Rangers; South China 1–1 Kitchee)
The attendance was 8,426 and the matches were played in Mong Kok Stadium. It was the first time in 11 eleven years that Mong Kok Stadium is full for a First Division League match. (The full capacity of the stadium is 8,500. The unoccupied seats are due to unattended reserve tickets owners) It is also the first time since 1996 Senior Shield semi-final of Instant-Dict against South China where there is a full house in local Hong Kong football matches. One possible reason for the high attendance is that the result of the South China-Kitchee match may decide the champion of the season. Either South China won or Kitchee won by 3–0 or more, the winner would be granted champion. However, the match ended 1–1, which means that the league champion would be decided after the last round matches.

 Worst discipline match
(round 4) (Happy Valley 0–3 Kitchee)
In a match played on the National Day holiday, 5 players were sent off in the match. Three were from Happy Valley and two from Kitchee. A total of 5 red cards and 8 yellow cards were issued in the match.
(Round 4) (Xiangxue Sun Hei 1–2 Lanwa Redbull)
4 players of Xiangxue Sun Hei were sent off within the last 4 minutes of the match.

Mid-season highlights
Reference:

Statistics
 Number of matches: 45
 Number of draw matches: 9
 Number of matches with score difference: 36
 Average attendance: about 1,500 (50% higher than last season)
 Total goals: 145
 Average goal: 3.22 per match
 Top goalscorer: Tales Schutz of South China (8 goals)
 Hat-trick players: Keith Jerome Gumbs of Kitchee in 6–1 match against Wofoo Tai Po (Round 2), Julius Pongla Akosah of Kitchee in 4–0 match against HKFC (Round 6)
 Highest scoring games: (round 9) (Wofoo Tai Po 4–3 Happy Valley), (Round 2) (Wofoo Tai Po 1–6 Kitchee )
 Biggest goal difference: (round 3) (Lanwa Redbull 6–0 Wofoo Tai Po)

Mid-season standings

Fixtures and results
All times are Hong Kong Time (UTC+8).
As of 14 April 2007

Round 1

Round 2

Round 3

Round 4

Round 5

Round 6

Round 7

Round 8

Round 9

Round 10

Round 11

Round 12

Round 13

Round 14

Round 15

Round 16

Round 17

Round 18

Scorers
17 goals
Tales Schutz of South China (top goalscorer of this season)

15 goals
Detinho of South China
Julius Akosah of Kitchee

12 goals
Aldo Arsenio Villalba Torres of Lanwa Redbull
Keith Gumbs of Kitchee

11 goals
Lico of Xiangxue Sun Hei

9 goals
Godfred Karikari of Rangers

8 goals
Chan Siu Ki of Kitchee

7 goals
Gerard Ambassa of Happy Valley

6 goals
Joel of Wofoo Tai Po

5 goals
Christian Kwesi Annanof Wofoo Tai Po
Jaimes Mckee of HKFC
Sham Kwok Keung of Happy Valley

4 goals
Anderson da Silva of Kitchee
Delphin Tshibanda Tshibangu of Citizen
Fan Weijun of Rangers
Kwok Kin Pong of South China
Leung Chun Pong of Citizen
Li Haiqiang of South China
So Loi Keung of Wofoo Tai Po
Wilfed Ndzedzeni Bamnjo of Kitchee
Zhang Yu of Lanwa Redbull
Lin Zhong of Lanwa Redbull

3 goals
Au Yeung Yiu Chungg of Hong Kong 08
Chao Pengfei of Citizen
Chu Siu Kei of Xiangxue Sun Hei
Edgar Aldrighi Junior of Wofoo Tai Po
Festus Baise of Citizen
Gao Wen of Kitchee
Lee Wai Lim of Wofoo Tai Po
Poon Man Tik of Happy Valley
Ju Yingzhi of Citizen

2 goals
Akandu Lawrence Chimezie of HKFC
Antonio Serrano Davila of Xiangxue Sun Hei
Au Wai Lun of South China
Chan Ho Man of Xiangxue Sun Hei
Chan Man Fai of Hong Kong 08
Cheng Lai Hin of HKFC
Kwok Yue Hung of Kitchee
Law Chun Bong of Happy Valley
Lee Hong Lim of Wofoo Tai Po
Lee Kin Wo of Xiangxue Sun Hei
Lee Sze Ming of Happy Valley
Li Chun Yip of Citizen
Lo Chi Kwan of Xiangxue Sun Hei
Marcio Gabriel Anaclato of Xiangxue Sun Hei
Poon Yiu Cheuk of Happy Valley
So Wai Chuen of Hong Kong 08
Stephen Musah of Citizen
Sze Kin Wai of Wofoo Tai Po
Vítor Hugo of Xiangxue Sun Hei
Wen Kai of Lanwa Redbull
Wong Chin Hung of Rangers
Wong Chun Yue of South China
Xie Wei of Xiangxue Sun Hei
Ye Nan of Lanwa Redbull
Yuan Yang of Citizen

Scorers with 1 goal are not listed here.

Annual awards

Hong Kong Footballer of the Year
Li Haiqiang of South China

Hong Kong Top Footballer
Detinho of South China
Lo Chi Kwan of Xiangxue Sun Hei
Li Haiqiang of South China
Gerard Ambassa of Happy Valley
Vandre Sagerillo Monteiro of Happy Valley
Zhang Chunhui of South China
Keith Gumbs of Kitchee
Cristiano Cordeiro of Xiangxue Sun Hei
Ivan Jević of Kitchee
Chan Wai Ho of South China
Christian Kwesi Annan of Wofoo Tai Po

Most Favorite Player
Cristiano Cordeiro of Xiangxue Sun Hei

Best coach 
Casemiro Mior of South China

Best Youth Players 
 Leung Chun Pong of Citizen AA
 Chan Siu Ki of Kitchee FC

See also
Hong Kong First Division League
The Hong Kong Football Association
2006–07 in Hong Kong football
2006–07 Hong Kong FA Cup
2006–07 Hong Kong League Cup
2006–07 Hong Kong Senior Challenge Shield

References

External links
The Hong Kong Football Association official site

Hong Kong First Division League seasons
1
Hong Kong